Godfrey C. Danchimah, Jr. (born July 21, 1969), professionally known as Godfrey, is an American comedian and actor who has appeared on BET, VH1, Comedy Central, and feature films, such as Soul Plane, Original Gangstas, Zoolander, and Johnson Family Vacation. He was also a spokesperson for 7 Up during the popular '7up yours' advertising campaign and a cast member on the first season of The It Factor, a reality television show. Currently, he is a regular performer at the comedy club Comedy Cellar in New York City. He is also known for doing the voices of Mr. Stubborn and Mr. Tall (Season 2) in The Mr. Men Show and hosting the FOX game show Bullseye. Godfrey also hosted his own radio show on SiriusXM until he parted ways with the show on July 1, 2019. He now owns and hosts a podcast called ‘In Godfrey We Trust’ on the Gas Digital Network. He is also known for collaborating with other social media stars such as King Bach, Destorm Power, etc. He was once a regular guest on VladTV.

Biography

Godfrey's parents are from Nigeria. Their Nigerian heritage is of the Igbo tribe. They emigrated to the US to escape the Nigerian Civil War. Godfrey is a nephew of Nigerian musician Sonny Okosun.

Godfrey was born in Lincoln, Nebraska on July 21, 1969. Soon after, the family settled in Chicago where Godfrey grew up. He attended Lane Technical College Preparatory High School and received an academic scholarship to the University of Illinois at Urbana–Champaign, where he majored in psychology.

At the University of Illinois, he made the varsity football team and performed at a traditional talent show for new team members. He stole the show, performing impressions of his coaches and teammates and discovered his comedic talent.

Career

Godfrey honed his stand-up skills at the All Jokes Aside comedy club in Chicago in the early 1990s. In 1995, Godfrey made his New York debut at Carolines on Broadway and the Comic Strip Live and was soon signed by the William Morris Talent Agency. He began working regularly in television, first behind the cameras as a warm-up comedian for Cosby and Soul Man. His first on-camera appearance featured him performing stand-up comedy for NBC's Friday Night Videos, followed by more small television and film roles. In 2000, Godfrey appeared in the Aspen Comedy Festival and on Comedy Central's Premium Blend. He also played a comical role in the movie Soul Plane, acting as an African pilot. He has also been in numerous episodes of BET's Comic View.

A self-styled karate master, he continues to do film and television work alongside his stand-up career in New York. His first one-hour special, "Godfrey: Black by Accident" was shot for Comedy Central on January 22, 2011 at the Gramercy Theatre in New York City to a standing room only audience.

As a guest of Mike Ward's show called "F*ck les variétés", part of the Just for Laughs 2012 festival of Montreal, his performance was highly acclaimed. In the following year, he had his own solo show called "The Godfrey Complex" in the same festival for a whole week.

His second one-hour special, "Godfrey: Regular Black" was shot in Chicago, his home town, on August 12, 2016.

Filmography

Film

Television

Comedy releases

See also
 List of Igbo people

References

External links
Official website

Comedy Central entry for Godfrey 

1969 births
American male comedians
American male film actors
American male television actors
American male voice actors
African-American male actors
African-American male comedians
African-American stand-up comedians
American stand-up comedians
Illinois Fighting Illini football players
Living people
Actors from Lincoln, Nebraska
Igbo male actors
American people of Igbo descent
20th-century American comedians
21st-century American comedians
20th-century African-American people
21st-century African-American people